Ulysses Township may refer to one of the following places within the United States:

 Ulysses Township, Butler County, Nebraska
 Ulysses Township, Potter County, Pennsylvania

See also

Ulysses (disambiguation)

Township name disambiguation pages